The 2022–23 Mississippi State Bulldogs women's basketball team represented Mississippi State University in the 2022–23 college basketball season. Led by first year head coach Sam Purcell, the team played their home games at Humphrey Coliseum and are members of the Southeastern Conference.

Schedule and results

|-
!colspan=12 style=|Non-conference regular season

|-
!colspan=12 style=|SEC regular season

|-
!colspan=9 style=| SEC Tournament

|-
!colspan=9 style=| NCAA Tournament

See also
 2022–23 Mississippi State Bulldogs men's basketball team

References

Mississippi State Bulldogs women's basketball seasons
Mississippi State Bulldogs
Mississippi State Bulldogs women's basketball
Mississippi State Bulldogs women's basketball
Mississippi State